Khalid Al Attar Tower 2, aka Millennium Hotel, is a 66-floor tower on Sheikh Zayed Road in Dubai, United Arab Emirates. The tower has a total structural height of 294 m (853 ft). Construction of the Khalid Al Attar Tower 2 was completed in 2011.

See also 
 List of tallest buildings in Dubai
 List of tallest buildings in the United Arab Emirates

References

External links

 Khalid Al Attar Tower 2 on CTBUH Skyscraper Center
Khalid Al Attar Tower 2 on Emporis
Khalid Al Attar Tower 2 on ProTenders

Hotel buildings completed in 2011
Office buildings completed in 2011
Skyscraper hotels in Dubai
Skyscraper office buildings in Dubai